RaShawn Stores (born April 5, 1991) is an American basketball coach and player who is currently the interim head coach for the Manhattan Jaspers basketball team. Stores was previously the associate head coach for Manhattan from 2017 to 2022. He was elevated to interim head coach of Manhattan following the resignation of Steve Masiello. Stores also played basketball for Manhattan collegiately from 2012 to 2016.

Personal life and high school
RaShawn Stores was born on April 5, 1991, to Latrebia Stores. Stores was raised in the Bronx and attended the revered All Hallows High School where he played basketball, where he played with future college teammate and fellow coach Michael Alvarado. Stores also played one year of basketball for the Robinson School in New Jersey before his collegiate career.

College career
Despite getting offers from colleges like the University of Massachusetts, Cincinnati University, and St. Francis University, Stores chose to attend Manhattan College. Stores redshirt as a freshman and thus did not play any for his first year at Manhattan. In his first year of collegiate play at Manhattan, he was MAAC rookie of the week three times and ultimately was named to the MAAC All-Rookie team. In his sophomore year, Stores averaged slightly fewer points per game but did start eleven more games than he did the previous year. The next year Stores averaged his highest points per game up to this point and improved as the season progressed, helping Manhattan win the MAAC Championship game and reaching the NCAA Division I tournament. In his senior and final year, Stores recorded his best stats from all his collegiate career and was nominated as a Lefty Driesell Defensive All-American.

Coaching career
While playing his college basketball career at Manhattan, Stores was simultaneously working to achieve his bachelor's degree in business management which he received in 2015. After receiving his bachelor's, Stores then worked on receiving his master's degree in organizational leadership which he achieved in 2017. Following his completion of his bachelor's and master's degrees, Stores returned as a coach to the college he once played basketball for and began coaching for Manhattan. Due to the unexpected sudden firing of long-time coach Steve Masiello for Manhattan, Stores was thrust into the role of the interim head coach just two weeks before the start of the 2022–23 Manhattan basketball season.

Head coaching record

References

1991 births
Living people
Basketball coaches from New York (state)
College men's basketball head coaches in the United States
Manhattan Jaspers basketball coaches
Manhattan Jaspers basketball players
Sportspeople from the Bronx
Basketball players from New York City